Bombard The Headquarters – My Big-Character Poster was a short document written by Chairman Mao Zedong on August 5, 1966, during the 11th Plenary Session of the 8th Central Committee of the Chinese Communist Party, and published in the Communist Party's official newspaper People's Daily a year later, on August 5, 1967.

It is commonly believed that this "big-character poster" directly targeted Chinese President Liu Shaoqi and senior leader Deng Xiaoping, who were then in charge of the Chinese government's daily affairs and who tried to cool down the mass movement which had been coming into shape in several universities in Beijing since the May 16 Notice, through which Mao officially launched the Cultural Revolution, was issued.

Many larger-scale mass persecutions followed the publication of this big-character poster, resulting in turmoil throughout the country and the death of thousands of "class enemies", including President Liu Shaoqi.

The original text of the poster was:

English translation:

See also
 Cultural Revolution

References

External links 
 Bombard The Headquarters – My First Big-Character Poster from the Marxists Internet Archive.

Cultural Revolution
Maoist China
Cold War history of China
Ideology of the Chinese Communist Party
Works by Mao Zedong
People's Daily